The Bangladesh Awami League, often simply called the Awami League or AL, is a centrist to  centre-left political party in Bangladesh and one of the major political parties in Bangladesh, being the ruling party of Bangladesh since 2009.

The All Pakistan Awami Muslim League was founded in Dhaka, the capital of the Pakistani province of East Bengal, in 1949 by Bengali nationalists Abdul Hamid Khan Bhashani, Shawkat Ali, Yar Mohammad Khan, and Shamsul Huq, and joined later by Huseyn Shaheed Suhrawardy who went on to become Prime Minister of Pakistan. The Pakistan Awami Muslim League was established as the Bengali alternative to the domination of the Muslim League in Pakistan and over centralisation of the government. The party quickly gained a massive popular support in East Bengal, later named East Pakistan, and eventually led the forces of Bengali nationalism in the struggle against West Pakistan's military and political establishment.

The party under the leadership of Sheikh Mujibur Rahman, led the struggle for independence, first through massive populist and civil disobedience movements, such as the Six Point Movement and 1971 Non-Cooperation Movement, and then during the Bangladesh Liberation War.

After the emergence of independent Bangladesh, the Awami League won the first general elections in 1973 but was overthrown in 1975 after the assassination of Sheikh Mujibur Rahman. The party was forced by subsequent military regimes onto the political sidelines, and many of its senior leaders and activists were executed or jailed. After the restoration of democracy in 1990, the Awami League emerged as one of the principal players of Bangladeshi politics. Since 2009, when the Awami League came to power, Bangladesh has experienced democratic backsliding.

Amongst the leaders of the Awami League, five have become the President of Bangladesh, four have become the Prime Minister of Bangladesh and one became the Prime Minister of Pakistan. The incumbent Prime Minister of Bangladesh, Sheikh Hasina, has headed the party since 1981.

The Bangladesh Awami League's modern foreign policy is to maintain good foreign relations with all countries, including the US, the UK, France, and Germany as well as Russia and China.

History

Founding and early Pakistan era (1949–66)

During the post-Mughal era no political parties existed in the area known as Bangla or Bangal. After the British arrived and established government, the system of political representation (though much later) was adopted in the area of Bangla (Bengal) or introduced in Bengal. After the official departure of the British, the area known as East Bengal became a part of Pakistan, and the establishment of the Muslim was led by its founder Muhammad Ali Jinnah and his Muslim League party.

In 1948, there was rising agitation in East Bengal against the omission of Bengali script from coins, stamps and government exams. Thousands of students, mainly from the University of Dhaka, protested in Dhaka and clashed with security forces. Prominent student leaders including Shamsul Huq, Khaleque Nawaz khan, Shawkat Ali, Kazi Golam Mahboob, Oli Ahad, and Abdul Wahed were arrested and the police were accused of repression while charging protesters. In March, senior Bengali political leaders were attacked whilst leading protests demanding that Bengali be declared an official language in Pakistan. The leaders included A. K. Fazlul Huq, the former Prime Minister of undivided Bengal. Amidst the rising discontent in East Bengal, Jinnah visited Dhaka and announced that Urdu would be sole state language of Pakistan given its significance to Islamic nationalism in South Asia. The announcement caused an emotional uproar in East Bengal, where the native Bengali population resented Jinnah for his attempts to impose a language they hardly understood on the basis of upholding unity. The resentment was further fuelled by rising discrimination against Bengalis in government, industry, bureaucracy and the armed forces and the dominance of the Muslim League. The Bengalis argued that they constituted the ethnic majority of Pakistan's population and Urdu was unknown to the majority in East Bengal. Moreover, the rich literary heritage of the Bengali language and the deep rooted secular culture of Bengali society led to a strong sense of linguistic and cultural nationalism amongst the people of East Bengal. The only significant language in Pakistan not written in the Persian-Arabic script was Bengali. Against this backdrop, Bengali nationalism began to take root within the Muslim League and the party's Bengali members began to take a stand for recognition.

On 23 June 1949, Bengali nationalists from East Bengal broke away from the Muslim League, Pakistan's dominant political party, and established the All Pakistan Awami Muslim League. Maulana Abdul Hamid Khan Bhashani and Shamsul Huq were elected the first president and general secretary of the party respectively, Ataur Rahman Khan was elected the vice-president, Yar Mohammad Khan was elected as the treasurer, while Sheikh Mujibur Rahman, Khondaker Mostaq Ahmad and A. K. Rafiqul Hussain were elected the party's first joint secretaries. The party was formed to champion the rights of the masses in Pakistan against the powerful feudal establishment led by the Muslim League. However, due to its strength stemming from the discriminated Bengali population of Pakistan's eastern wing, the party eventually became associated and identified with East Bengal.

In 1952, the Awami Muslim League and its student wing played an instrumental role in the Bengali Language Movement, during which Pakistani security forces fired upon thousands of protesting students demanding Bengali be declared an official language of Pakistan, famously killing a number of students including Abdus Salam, Rafiq Uddin Ahmed, Abul Barkat and Abdul Jabbar. The events of 1952 are widely seen by historians today as a turning point in the history of Pakistan and the Bengali people, as it was the starting point of the Bengali nationalist struggle that eventually culminated in the creation of Bangladesh in 1971.

Hussein Shaheed Suhrawardy, who had been the AIML-nominated prime minister of Bengal in 1937 and held the same office after 1946 elections, did not agree to 'Muslim League' as the name of AIML in Pakistan. He initiated the thought that the ideal of political representation under religious identity was no longer prudent after independence and the organisation might be named as Pakistan League. Moreover, he claimed that Muslim League's objective of struggling to form a nation state had been achieved therefore political representation should continue focusing on nationalism based on Pakistani sovereignty. Suhrawardy's suggestion was not accepted, thus, he parted ways with the party to be reestablished as the Awami League in 1949. This was to serve the first shock to the country's political structure. In 1953, the party's council meeting voted to drop the word "Muslim". In the run-up to the East Bengal Legislative Assembly Elections in 1954, the Awami League took the lead in negotiations in forming a pan-Bangla political alliance including the Krishak Praja Party, Nizam-e-Islam and Ganatantrik Dal. The alliance was termed the Jukta Front or United Front and formulated the Ekush Dafa, or 21-point Charter, to fight for establishing rights in East Pakistan. The party also took the historic decision to adopt the traditional Bengali boat, which signified the attachment to rural Bengal, as its election symbol.

The election in April 1954 swept the United Front coalition into power in East Bengal with a massive mandate of 223 seats out of 237 seats. The Awami League itself won 143 seats while the Muslim League won only 9 seats. Veteran student leader and language movement stalwart Khaleque Nawaz Khan defeated incumbent prime minister of the then East Bengal Mr. Nurul Amin in a landslide margin. Mr. Nurul Amin was defeated in his home Nandail constituency. Khaleque Nawaz Khan created history at age 27 by defeating sitting prime minister and Muslim League was wiped out from political landscape of the then East Pakistan. A. K. Fazlul Huq assumed the office of Chief Minister of East Bengal and drew up a cabinet containing many of the prominent student activists that were leading movements against the Pakistani state. They included Sheikh Mujibur Rahman from the Awami League, who served as commerce minister.

Leaders of the new provincial government demanded greater provincial autonomy for East Bengal and eventually succeeded in pressuring Prime Minister Muhammad Ali Bogra, himself a Bengali, to endorse the proposed constitutional recognition of Bengali as an official language of Pakistan. The United Front also passed a landmark order for the establishment of the Bangla Academy in Dhaka.
As tensions with the western wing grew due to the demands for greater provincial autonomy in East Bengal, Governor-General Ghulam Muhammad dismissed the United Front government on 29 May 1954 under Article 92/A of the provisional constitution of Pakistan.

In September 1956, the Awami League formed a coalition with the Republican Party to secure a majority in the new National Assembly of Pakistan and took over the central government. Awami League President Huseyn Shaheed Suhrawardy became the Prime Minister of Pakistan. Suhrawardy pursued a reform agenda to reduce the long-standing economic disparity between East and West Pakistan, greater representation of Bengalis in the Pakistani civil and armed services and he unsuccessfully attempted to alleviate the food shortage in the country.

The Awami League also began deepening relations with the United States. The government moved to join the Southeast Asia Treaty Organisation (SEATO) and Central Treaty Organisation (CENTO), the two strategic defence alliances in Asia inspired by the North Atlantic Treaty Organization (NATO). Maulana Bhashani, one of the party's founders, condemned the decision of the Suhrawardy government and called a conference in February 1957 at Kagmari, Tangail in East Bengal. He protested the move and the support lent by the Awami League leadership to the government. Bhashani broke away from the Awami League and then formed the leftist National Awami Party (NAP).
Yar Mohammad Khan funded the 5-day Kagmari Conference. He was the treasurer of the kagmari conference committee.

The controversy over One Unit (the division of Pakistan into only two provinces, east and west) and the appropriate electoral system for Pakistan, whether joint or separate, also revived as soon as Suhrawardy became Prime Minister. In West Pakistan, there was strong opposition to the joint electorate by the Muslim League and the religious parties. The Awami League however, strongly supported the joint electorate. These differences over One Unit and the appropriate electorate caused problems for the government.

By early 1957, the movement for the dismemberment of the One Unit had started. Suhrawardy was at the mercy of central bureaucracy fighting to save the One Unit. Many in the business elite in Karachi were lobbying against Suhrawardy's decision to distribute millions of dollars of American aid to East Pakistan and to set up a national shipping corporation. Supported by these lobbyists, President Iskander Mirza demanded the Prime Minister's resignation. Suhrawardy requested to seek a vote of confidence in the National Assembly, but this request was turned down. Suhrawardy resigned under threat of dismissal on 10 October 1957.

On 7 October 1958, President Iskander Mirza declared martial law and appointed army chief General Ayub Khan as Chief Martial Law Administrator. Ayub Khan eventually deposed Mirza in a bloodless coup. By promulgating the Political Parties Elected Bodies Disqualified Ordinance, Ayub banned all major political parties in Pakistan. Senior politicians, including the entire top leadership of the Awami League, were arrested and most were kept under detention till 1963.

In 1962, Ayub Khan drafted a new constitution, modelled on indirect election, through an electoral college, and termed it 'Basic Democracy'. Huseyn Shaheed Suhrawardy joined Nurul Amin, Khwaja Nazimuddin, Maulvi Farid Ahmed and Hamidul Haq Chowdhury in forming National Democratic Front against Ayub Khan's military-backed rule and to restore elective democracy. However the alliance failed to obtain any concessions. Instead the electoral colleges appointed a new parliament and the President exercised executive authority.

Widespread discrimination prevailed in Pakistan against Bengalis during the regime of Ayub Khan. The University of Dhaka became a hotbed for student activism advocating greater rights for Bengalis and the restoration of democracy in Pakistan.

On 5 December 1963, Huseyn Shaheed Suhrawardy was found dead in his hotel room in Beirut, Lebanon. His sudden death under mysterious circumstances gave rise to speculation within the Awami League and the general population in East Pakistan that he had been poisoned.

Struggle for Independence and Mujib era (1966–75) 

The 6-point demands, proposed by Mujib, were widely accepted by the East Pakistani populace, as they proposed greater autonomy for the provinces of Pakistan. After the so-called Agartala Conspiracy Case, and subsequent end of the Ayub Khan's regime in Pakistan, the Awami League and its leader Sheikh Mujib reached the peak of their popularity among the East Pakistani Bengali population. In the elections of 1970, the Awami League won 167 of 169 East Pakistan seats in the National Assembly but none of West Pakistan's 138 seats. It also won 288 of the 300 provincial assembly seats in East Pakistan. This win gave the Awami League a healthy majority in the 313-seat National Assembly and placed it in a position to establish a national government without a coalition partner. This was not acceptable to the political leaders of West Pakistan who feared the 6 points were a step towards breaking up the country and led directly to the events of the Bangladesh Liberation War. A particular point of disagreement was transferring 6 powers to one province which was unprecedented. The Awami League leaders, taking refuge in India, successfully led the war against the Pakistan Army throughout 1971. Leader Sheikh Mujib was arrested by the Pakistan Army on 25 March 1971, but the Bangladeshi people continued the fight to free themselves for nine months.

After victory on 16 December 1971, the party formed the national government of Bangladesh. In 1972, under Sheikh Mujib, the party name was changed to "Awami League". The new government faced many challenges as they rebuilt the country and carried out mine clearing operations. The party had pro Pakistani newspaper editors arrested and shut down the nations' newspapers leaving only four in operation. Food shortages were also a major concern of the Awami League. War had damaged all forms of farming. The party aligned itself with NAM, and leaned towards the Soviet bloc. The party was accused of corruption by supporters of Pakistan. In 1974 Bangladesh suffered a famine: 70,000 people died, and support for Mujib declined. Bangladesh continued exporting jute to Cuba, violating US economic sanctions, the Nixon government barred grain imports to Bangladesh. This exacerbated famine conditions.

In January 1975, facing violent leftist insurgents Mujib declared a state of emergency and later assumed the presidency, after the Awami League dominated parliament decided to switch from parliamentary to a presidential form of government. Sheikh Mujib renamed the League the Bangladesh Krishak Sramik Awami League, and banned all other parties. The consequences lead to a critical political state. BAKSAL was dissolved after the assassination of Sheikh Mujibur Rahman.

The move towards a secular form of government caused widespread dissatisfaction among many low ranking military personnel, most of whom received training from Pakistan army. On 15 August 1975 during the time of K M Shafiullah as a Head of the Army Stuffs. some junior members of the armed forces in Dhaka, led by Major Faruk Rahman and Major Rashid, murdered Sheikh Mujibur Rahman and all his family members, including his wife and minor son. Within months, on 3 November 1975, four more of its top leaders, Syed Nazrul Islam, Tajuddin Ahmed, Captain Muhammad Mansur Ali and A. H. M. Qamaruzzaman were killed inside the Dhaka Central Jail as they were on behalf of BAKSAL. Only Sheikh Hasina and Sheikh Rehana, two daughters of Mujib, survived the massacre as they were in West Germany as a part of a cultural exchange program. They later claimed political asylum in the United Kingdom. Sheikh Rehana, the younger sister, chose to remain in the UK permanently, while Sheikh Hasina moved to India and lived in self-imposed exile. Her stays abroad helped her gain important political friends in the West and in India that proved to be a valuable asset for the party in the future.

Struggle for democracy and Hasina era (1981–present)

After 1975, the party remained split into several rival factions and fared poorly in the 1979 parliamentary elections held under a military government. In 1981 Sheikh Hasina returned as Ziaur Rahman allowed her to return after the largest party faction, the Awami League elected her its president, and she proceeded to take over the party leadership and unite the factions. As she was under age at the time she could not take part in the 1981 presidential elections that followed the assassination of President Ziaur Rahman. Throughout the following nine years of military rule by General Hossain Mohammad Ershad the Awami League participated in some polls but boycotted most as Ershad did not believe in democracy. On 7 May 1986, Awami League participated in the general election of Bangladesh staged by military ruler Lt Gen Hussain Muhammad Ershad even though the other major political party and the winner of previous elections Bangladesh Nationalist Party boycotted. British observers including a journalists termed the elections a "tragedy for democracy" and a "cynically frustrated exercise".

The Awami League emerged as the largest opposition party in parliament in the elections in 1991, in which Khaleda Zia became the first female prime minister.

AL's second term in office had mixed achievements. Apart from sustaining economic stability during the Asian economic crisis, the government successfully settled Bangladesh's long standing dispute with India over sharing the water of the river Ganges (also known as Padma) in late 1996, and signed a peace treaty with tribal rebels in 1997. In 1998, Bangladesh faced one of the worst floods ever, and the government handled the crisis satisfactorily. It also had significant achievements in containing inflation, and peacefully neutralising a long-running leftist insurgency in south-western districts dating back to the first AL government's time. However, rampant corruption allegations against party office bearers and ministers as well as a deteriorating law and order situation troubled the government. Its pro poor policies achieved wide microeconomic development but that left the country's wealthy business class dissatisfied. The AL's last months in office were marred by sporadic bombing by alleged Islamist militants. Hasina herself escaped several attempts on her life, in one of which two anti-tank mines were planted under her helipad in Gopalganj district. In July 2001, the second AL government stepped down, becoming the first elected government in Bangladesh to serve a full term in office.

The party won only 62 out of 300 parliamentary seats in the elections held in October 2001, despite winning 40% of the votes, up from 36% in 1996 and 33% in 1991. The BNP and its allies won a two-thirds majority in parliament with 46% of the votes cast, with BNP alone winning 41%, up from 33% in 1996 and 30% in 1991.

In its second term in opposition since 1991, the party suffered the assassination of several key members. Popular young leader Ahsanullah Master, a member of parliament from Gazipur, was killed in 2004. This was followed by a grenade attack on Hasina during a public meeting on 21 August 2004, resulting in the death of 22 party supporters, including party women's secretary Ivy Rahman, though Hasina lived. Finally, the party's electoral secretary, ex finance minister, and veteran diplomat Shah M S Kibria, a member of parliament from Habiganj, was killed in a grenade attack in Sylhet later that year.

In June 2005, the Awami League won an important victory when the AL nominated incumbent mayor A.B.M. Mohiuddin Chowdhury won the important mayoral election in Chittagong, by a huge margin, against BNP nominee State Minister of Aviation Mir Mohammad Nasiruddin. This election was seen as a showdown between the Awami League and the BNP. However, the killing of party leaders continued. In December 2005, the AL supported Mayor of Sylhet narrowly escaped the third attempt on his life as a grenade thrown at him failed to explode.

In September 2006, several of the party's top leaders, including Saber Hossain Chowdhury MP and Asaduzzaman Nur MP, were hospitalised after being critically injured by police beatings while they demonstrated in support of electoral-law reforms. Starting in late October 2006, the Awami League led alliance carried out a series of nationwide demonstrations and blockades centring on the selection of the leader of the interim caretaker administration to oversee the 2007 elections. Although an election was scheduled to take place on 22 January 2007 that the Awami League decided to boycott, the country's military intervened on 11 January 2007 and installed an interim government composed of retired bureaucrats and military officers.

Throughout 2007 and 2008, the military backed government tried to root out corruption and remove Sheikh Hasina and Khaleda Zia of the AL and BNP respectively. While these efforts largely failed, they succeeded in producing a credible voter list that was used on 29 December 2008 national election.

The Awami League won the national election held on 29 December 2008 as part of a larger electoral alliance that also included the Jatiya Party led by former military ruler General Hussain Muhammad Ershad as well as some leftist parties. According to the Official Results, Bangladesh Awami League won 230 out of 299 constituencies, and together with its allies, had a total of 262 parliamentary seats. The Awami League and its allies received 57% of the total votes cast. The AL alone got 48%, compared to 36% of the other major alliance led by the BNP which by itself got 33% of the votes. Sheikh Hasina, as party head, became the new Prime Minister. Her term of office began in January 2009. The current cabinet has several new faces, including three women in prominent positions: Dr Dipu Moni (Foreign Minister), Matia Chowdhury (Agriculture Minister) and Sahara Khatun (Home Minister). Younger MPs with a link to assassinated members of the 1972–1975 AL government are Syed Ashraful Islam, son of Syed Nazrul Islam, Sheikh Taposh, son of Sheikh Fazlul Huq Moni, and Sohel Taj, son of Tajuddin Ahmad.

Since 2009, the Awami League government faced several major political challenges, including BDR (Bangladesh Rifles) mutiny, power crisis, unrest in garments industry and stock market fluctuations. Judicial achievements for the party included restoring original 1972 constitution, returning secularism to the constitution, beginning of war crimes trials, and guilty verdict in 1975 assassination trial. According to the Nielsen 2-year survey, 50% felt the country was moving in the right direction, and 36% gave the government a favourable rating.

In the 2014 election the Awami League led  alliance won a second term of which 154 Members (out of 300) of Parliament were selected where there were no election . Only 5% voter attended in the polling station and cast their votes. The opposition and one of the most popular parties (BNP) boycotted the election for removing the caretaker government (neutral government) system from the constitution after completion of 5 years tenure. With 21 people dead due to the violence during election, along with further human rights abuses and an absence of opposition, this was one of the controversial general elections in Bangladesh's history. This election was further tainted by arrests where dozens of opposition leaders and members were taken into custody.

Name and symbols

The All Pakistan Awami Muslim League or the East Pakistan Awami Muslim League was formed as a breakaway faction of the "All Pakistan Muslim League" in 1949, within two years of the formation of Pakistan. The word Muslim was dropped in 1953 and it became the secular Awami League. During the Bangladesh Liberation War of 1971, most of the Awami League members joined the Provisional Government of Bangladesh and Mukti Bahini guerrillas to fight against the Pakistani army and the name "Bangladesh Awami League" was eventually settled upon.

The most common mascot and electoral symbol for the party has been the boat, which signified the attachment to rural Bengal. Traditionally the party had no consistent colour identity. After the 1991 election, the colour green became associated with Awami League, while blue has become the identifying colour for rival nationalist party.

The salutation "Joy Bangla" (meaning Victory to Bengal or "Long live Bengal") is the official slogan of the Awami League. It was the slogan and war cry of the Mukti Bahini that fought for the independence of Bangladesh during the Bangladesh Liberation War in 1971. The phrase "Joy Bangla, Joy Bangabandhu" is used by the party members at the end of speeches and communications pertaining to or referring to patriotism towards Bangladesh and Bangabandhu Sheikh Mujib.

The Awami League party flag is a green field with four five-rayed red star at its centre, and a vertical red stripe at the hoist side. The flag also bears some resemblance to the flag of Pakistan, showing the ex-Pakistani origin of the Awami League. The four stars on the Flag represent the four fundamental principles of the party: nationalism, secularism, socialism, and democracy.

Ideology
 
 

The Bangladesh Awami League styles itself as the leader of the "pro-liberation" forces in Bangladesh, promoting secular and social democratic sections of the political establishment in the country. The party constitution states, and in two cases defines the reason for, four fundamental principles in guiding its philosophy and policies. They include:
 Democracy
 Socialism
 Secularism
 Nationalism

Before the 2008 general elections in Bangladesh, the Awami League announced in its manifesto, its "Vision 2021" and "Digital Bangladesh" action plans to transform Bangladesh into a fast-developing middle-income country by 2021. The party uses the term "Shonar Bangla", or golden Bengal, to describe its vision for Bangladesh to become a modern developed nation. The term is reminiscent of Bangladesh's national anthem and a utopian vision in Bengali nationalism.

Prime Minister of Bangladesh Sheikh Hasina supported calls to remove the Statue of Justice in Bangladesh Supreme Court. Many criticized these calls, saying Sheikh Hasina was bowing down to the pressure of Islamist political hard-liners.

In recent years, the party has begun espousing more economically liberal positions, and has moved closer to the centre of the political spectrum.

Organization

Constitution
The Constitution of the Bangladesh Awami League has 24 Articles and includes contents of General Program, Membership, Organization System, Central Organizations, Name, Aims and Objectives, Fundamental Principles, Commitments. In accordance with the changing situation and tasks, revisions were made in some of the articles at the National Conference.

National Conference
The National Conference NC is the party's highest body, and, since the 1st National Conference in 1949, has been convened every three years (sometimes on an irregular basis). According to the party's constitution, the National Conference may be postponed on except "under extraordinary circumstances." The party constitution gives the NC following responsibilities:
 electing the President
 electing the general secretary
 examining the report of the outgoing Central Working Committee
 discussing and enacting party policies
 revising the party's constitution

In practice, the party councillors and delegates rarely discuss issues at length at the National Conference. Most substantive discussion takes place before the Conference, in the preparation period, among a group of top party leaders. In between National Conferences, the Central Working Committee is the highest decision-making institution.

Central Working Committee

The Central Working Committee of the Awami League is a political body that comprises the top leaders of the Party. It is currently composed of 81 full members and 29 alternate members. Members are elected once every three years by the National Conference of the Bangladesh Awami League.
The Central Working Committee is made up of the following:
 The Party Presidium:
 The party President;
 17 Presidium members;
 The general secretary;
 4 Joint general secretary;
 The Treasurer;
 28 Additional members;
 29 Secretaries of the Sub Committee;

and
 10 Parliamentary Committee member

Advisory Council
Almost 38 Advisory Council members working as party's think-tank and are not Part of the Central Working Committee The Awami League Advisory Council is the highest governing of Bangladesh Awami League.

Centre for Research and Information
The Centre for Research and Information CRI  is the think-tank and research cell of the Awami League. The foundation offers political education, conducts scientific fact-finding research for political projects, grants scholarships to gifted individuals, researches the history of Awami League, and supports and encourages youth, international understanding, and development-policy co-operation.

Activities
 Let's Talk
 Policy Café
 CRI Junction
 Young Bangla and CRI: The Young Bangla Programme comprises the several schemes, acting as a flexible space for the youth, thousands of individuals and youth-led organizations, supporting them with resources and capacity enhancement trainings.

Wings

President and general secretary of the AL, 1949–present

State leaders from the AL, 1971–present

Electoral history
Jatiya Sangsad elections

See also 
 Politics of Bangladesh
 List of political parties in Bangladesh
 Bangladesh Nationalist Party
 List of political parties in Pakistan
 National Awami Party
 Awami National Party
Suchinta Foundation

References

External links
 
 Awami League web site 

 
1949 establishments in East Pakistan
History of East Pakistan
Political parties established in 1949
Political parties in Bangladesh
Politics of Bangladesh
Social liberal parties 
Social democratic parties 
Social democratic parties in Bangladesh 
Secularist organizations